William John Twaddell (1884 – 22 May 1922) was a Unionist politician from Belfast.

Twaddell was a draper from Belfast who was educated at a Belfast primary school.

He was a Member of Belfast City Council from 1910 and sat  as an Ulster Unionist Party member. In November 1921, he and Robert Boyd organised the Ulster Imperial Guards as a paramilitary force of 21,000 men.  He was elected to the Parliament of Northern Ireland for Belfast West from the general election of 1921 until he was assassinated on 22 May 1922 by the Irish Republican Army. He was walking in Garfield Street off Royal Avenue, to his business, a short distance away, and had been followed closely by his assassins.

His death precipitated a clamp-down on the IRA in Northern Ireland and 350 IRA members were interned. Seamus Woods, who was interned on HMS Argenta during the clampdown, was charged with his murder. Woods who had joined the Irish National Army was trying to control irregular elements within the IRA. By agreement with the government of Northern Ireland, two officers of the Irish National Army were given permission to travel to the trial. General Ginger O'Connell and Commandant Charles McAlister gave evidence and Woods was found not guilty.

Twaddell was buried at Drumcree Church where his headstone says that he was 'foully murdered in Belfast'.

References

 Stormont Biographies 

1884 births
1922 deaths
Politicians from Belfast
Ulster Unionist Party members of the House of Commons of Northern Ireland
Members of the House of Commons of Northern Ireland 1921–1925
Members of Belfast City Council
Assassinated politicians from Northern Ireland
People killed in the Irish Civil War
Members of the House of Commons of Northern Ireland for Belfast constituencies